Crimson, in comics, may refer to:

 Crimson (comic book), a comic book series from Images Comics' Cliffhanger imprint and DC Comics' Wildstorm imprint
 Crimson, one of the aliases used by Wildstorm character Jodi Slayton

It may also refer to:
Crimson Avenger, a number of DC Comics superheroes
Crimson Commando, a number of Marvel Comics superheroes
Crimson Cowl, a number of Marvel Comics superheroes
Crimson Crusader, a Marvel Comics characters in ClanDestine
Crimson Curse, a Marvel Comics character from the MC2 universe
Crimson Dawn, a fictional substance that has appeared in Marvel Comics
Crimson Dynamo, a number of Marvel Comics character
Crimson Fox, a DC Comics superheroine
Crimson Gem of Cyttorak, a fictional object in the Marvel Universe which provides the power for Juggernaut
Crimson Guard, a group in GI Joe who appear in the comic book adaptation

See also
Crimson (disambiguation)